The 2022 Tajik Supercup is the 13th Tajik Supercup, an annual Tajik football match played between the winners of the previous season's Tajikistan Higher League and Tajikistan Cup. The match was contested by 2021 League champions Istiklol, and the 2021 Cup champions Khujand.

Background
On 4 May, it was confirmed that the Tajik Supercup would be held at the TALCO Arena in Tursunzoda on 8 May 2022.
On 5 May, Nasim Khamidov was confirmed as the match referee.

Match

Summary
A solitary second half goal from substitute Rustam Soirov in the 84th minute, sealed Istiklol's 11th Tajik Supercup title.

Details

See also
2021 Tajikistan Higher League
2021 Tajikistan Cup

References

Super Cup
Tajik Supercup